Paul Giéra (22 January 1816 – 26 April 1861) was a French Provençal poet.

Early life
Paul Giéra was born on 22 January 1816 in Avignon. His father was Jean Baptiste Joseph Giéra and his mother, Marie Madeleine Marguerite Crillon.

Career
Giéra was the owner of the Château de Font-Ségugne in Châteauneuf-de-Gadagne.

On 21 May 1854, he invited Joseph Roumanille, Frédéric Mistral, Théodore Aubanel, Alphonse Tavan, Jean Brunet and Anselme Mathieu, where they founded the Félibrige movement.

Death
He died on 26 April 1861 in his hometown of Avignon.

Legacy
The Collège Paul Giéra in Avignon was named in his honour. It closed down in 2009 due to lack of public funding.

The Gymnase Paul Giéra in Avignon was also named in his honour.

References

1816 births
1861 deaths
Writers from Avignon
19th-century French poets
French male poets
19th-century French male writers